Guo Chunning (born 1958) is a Chinese graphic designer and the vice president of the Beijing Armstrong International Corporate Identity (AICI). He is internationally known for designing Dancing Beijing, the official emblem of the 2008 Summer Olympics, held in Beijing in the People's Republic of China.

Information
Guo was born in 1958 in the city of Shenyang in Liaoning province in Northeast China. Since 1975, he studied art design at Tianjin Arts and Crafts School. In 1980, he was accepted to study commercial art at Decoration Department of Central Academy of Arts and Crafts which is now Academy of Arts & Design of Tsinghua University. Upon his graduation from the school in 1984, Guo worked at advertisement department of China Daily until 1988 to establish Beijing Shichuang International Design Co., Ltd In 2002, his logo design based on Chinese seal was selected among the 1,985 entires contributed by about 1300 designers from China and overseas.

See also
Dancing Beijing
2008 Summer Olympics
Zhang Jigang

References

1958 births
Living people
Chinese graphic designers
Chinese designers
2008 Summer Olympics
Tsinghua University alumni
Artists from Shenyang